The Mayor of Clutha officiates over the Clutha District of New Zealand which is administered by the Clutha District Council.

The current Mayor is Bryan Cadogan.

Clutha Mayors have been:

References

Clutha
Clutha District
Clutha
Clutha